Nicholas Croombes (born 1958) is a retired British boxer.

Boxing career
He represented England and won a silver medal in the 71 kg light-middleweight division, at the 1982 Commonwealth Games in Brisbane, Queensland, Australia.

References

1958 births
Living people
British male boxers
Commonwealth Games medallists in boxing
Boxers at the 1982 Commonwealth Games
Commonwealth Games silver medallists for England
Light-middleweight boxers
Medallists at the 1982 Commonwealth Games